Trachyuropoda is a genus of mites in the family Trachyuropodidae. There are more than 30 described species in Trachyuropoda.

Species
These 33 species belong to the genus Trachyuropoda:

 Trachyuropoda ablesi
 Trachyuropoda belunensis (Lombardini, 1962)
 Trachyuropoda berlesiana (Berlese, 1887)
 Trachyuropoda bostocki (Michael, 1894)
 Trachyuropoda canestriniana (Berlese, 1891)
 Trachyuropoda coccinea (Michael, 1891)
 Trachyuropoda cristiceps (G.Canestrini, 1884)
 Trachyuropoda excavata (Wasmann, 1899)
 Trachyuropoda formicaria (Lubbock, 1881)
 Trachyuropoda formicariasimilis
 Trachyuropoda imitans Berlese, 1905
 Trachyuropoda imperforata Berlese, 1904
 Trachyuropoda kiewensis
 Trachyuropoda lagrecai Lombardini, 1947
 Trachyuropoda magna (Leonardi, 1895)
 Trachyuropoda multituberculata
 Trachyuropoda multituberosa (Willmann, 1951)
 Trachyuropoda myrmecophila
 Trachyuropoda pecinai Hirschmann, 1976
 Trachyuropoda ponticuli Karg, 1989
 Trachyuropoda poppi Hirschmann & Zirngiebl-Nicol, 1969
 Trachyuropoda pseudoperforata Lombardini, 1947
 Trachyuropoda quadriauricularia
 Trachyuropoda represa
 Trachyuropoda riccardiana (Leonardi, 1895)
 Trachyuropoda schusterisimilis
 Trachyuropoda sellnicki Hirschmann & Zirngiebl-Nicol, 1969
 Trachyuropoda sinuata Berlese, 1904
 Trachyuropoda triouspis Banks
 Trachyuropoda troguloides (Canestrini & Fanzago, 1877)
 Trachyuropoda tuberosa
 Trachyuropoda wasmanniana Berlese, 1903
 Trachyuropoda willmanni Hirschmann & Zirngiebl-Nicol, 1969

References

Acari
Articles created by Qbugbot